Mohammad Yousuf is a Major General of Bangladesh Army. He is the Director General of the Department of Drug Administration. Prior to that, he worked in the Armed Forces and the Health Department and served at the Physical Medicine Department of Dhaka CMH as Head of the Department.He is a luminary physiatrist of Bangladesh Army and a father of 2 sons

References 

Living people
Year of birth missing (living people)
Bangladesh Army generals
Bangladeshi military personnel